Astrid Gynnild (born 1959) is professor of media studies at the Department of Information and Media Studies at the University of Bergen Norway. Gynnild is principal investigator of the trans-disciplinary research project ViSmedia (Responsible Adoption of Visual Surveillance Technologies in the News Media) 2015–19. Gynnild also heads the journalism program at the University of Bergen, which in 2017 will be integrated into Media City Bergen. Her research interests lie at the intersection of digital journalism, innovation and new technologies. She is also engaged in developing new forms of learning in profession oriented disciplines in higher education. Her scientific articles are published in journals such as Digital Journalism, Journalism Studies, Journalism, Nordicom Review and #ISOJ Journal.

In 2011–12, Gynnild was visiting research scholar at university of California, Berkeley, where she worked on projects of journalistic innovation, video, and surveillance. She got her PhD from the Department of Information and Media Studies in Bergen in 2006 after developing a grounded theory on creative and productive aspects of journalistic work processes, "Creative Cycling of News Professionals." The theory of creative cycling explains how journalists constantly develop and apply flexible, individualized solutions to handle increasing expectations of professional productivity in their work. The theory development was fueled by Gynnild's long and broad professional background in journalism. Before moving into a second career in academia, Gynnild was a reporter of sports, world news and later the photo and graphics editor in one of Norway's largest newspapers, Adresseavisen.  She was also a newsroom developer and manager of extensive redesign processes in the paper. Gynnild was a professor of journalism at the University of Stavanger 2012–14 and has previously taught at the Volda University College and Oslo University College.

For more than a decade, Gynnild has also been an active contributor to the global community of classic grounded theorists. She is the co-author, with Vivian B. Martin, of the anthology Grounded Theory: The Philosophy, Method and Work of Barney Glaser (Brown Walker Press, 319 pp.), published in 2012. Gynnild is Editor of  Grounded Theory Review. Fellow of the Grounded Theory Institute, and Chair of the Norwegian Council for Applied Media Research 2013–17.

External links 
 Publications of Astrid Gynnild in research documentation system CRIStin
 Publications of Astrid Gynnild BIBSYS
 Astrid Gynnild, University of Bergen

1959 births
Living people
Academic staff of the University of Stavanger
Academic staff of the University of Bergen
Place of birth missing (living people)